Tamara Vučić (born 11 April 1981) is the wife of the President of Serbia, Aleksandar Vučić.

Biography 
She was born in Belgrade. She grew up in Loznica, where she finished primary and high school. She graduated from the Faculty of Philology, University of Belgrade.

After a career as a television journalist, she chose diplomacy for her profession and has been working at the Ministry of Foreign Affairs of the Republic of Serbia since 2010. She graduated from the Diplomatic Academy of the Ministry of Foreign Affairs. She speaks English and French.

She is involved in humanitarian work and often attends humanitarian events. She is dedicated to humanitarian activities, with a special focus on the welfare of children and the importance of early development. 

She is the wife of Aleksandar Vučić, the president of Serbia since December 14, 2013. She has not been involved in her husband’s political campaign. In June 2017, she gave birth to their son, Vukan.

References

External links 
 Телеграф: Супруга Александра Вучића на пријему
 Недељник Афера: Ово је нова прва дама Србије
 Блиц: ТАМАРА ВУЧИЋ СА СУПРУГОМ ЈАПАНСКОГ ПРЕМИЈЕРА Донација од 80.000 евра Институту за мајку и дете
 Блиц: ПОСЕТА КАЛЕМЕГДАНУ И ИНСТИТУТУ ЗА МАЈКУ И ДЕТЕ Како је изгледало дружење првих дама Србије и Турске током посете Ердогана
 Story: Тамари Вучић уручено признање за изузетан допринос унапређењу положаја особа са ПАХ и несебичном залагању за спасавање људских живота!
 Хелоу магазин: Ексклузивни интервју Тамаре Вучић за нови ХЕЛЛО!

Living people
1981 births
University of Belgrade alumni
First Ladies of Serbia
Television people from Belgrade
People from Loznica
Diplomats from Belgrade